The 12th Kisei was the 12th edition of the Kisei tournament for the game of Go. Since Koichi Kobayashi won the previous year, he was given an automatic place in the final. Eleven players battled in a knockout tournament to decide the final two. Those two would then play each other in a best-of-3 match to decide who would face Kobayashi. Masao Kato became the challenger after beating Hideo Otake 2 games to 0, but would lose to Kobayashi 4 games to 1 in the final.

Tournament

Challenger finals

Finals 

Kisei (Go)
1988 in go